Always and Everyone (later known as A&E) is a British television medical drama, broadcast on ITV, that ran for four series between 7 June 1999 and 22 August 2002. Set in the Accident and Emergency department of Saint Victor's city hospital in Manchester (although some exterior scenes were filmed in Birmingham), the series follows the everyday lives of the doctors and nurses working in the department, and was heavily described as ITV's answer to Casualty, and the British equivalent of ER.

The series featured an ensemble cast, however the principal characters, Robert Kingsford (Martin Shaw) and Christine Fletcher (Niamh Cusack), appeared throughout all four series. David Harewood, whose character Mike Gregson was credited as the third principal character, appeared throughout the first three series. The first series introduced a total of ten regular cast members and additional ten recurring cast members. All ten regular cast members were also retained for the second series, and two additional regular characters, Andrew Argyle (Dominic Mafham) and Kate Brady (Tamzin Malleson), were introduced.

The third series saw a major overhaul in both cast and format, with the series being rebranded as A&E, a new theme being introduced to the opening titles, and storylines focusing more heavily on the inter-personal relationships between the hospital's staff members. Although all twelve regular cast members returned, by the end of the series, eight had departed, with many receiving much less screen time than in previous series. A new principal character, Jack Turner (Michael Kitchen), was introduced at the start of the series to act as a catalyst between Christine and Robert. Jane Danson was also introduced as new regular cast member Samantha Docherty.

Following the loss of a large chunk of the main cast, the fourth series saw the introduction of twelve new characters, including new senior doctors Ruth Cole (Jaye Griffiths) and Danny Barton (James Murray), with only four of the show's original stars returning. A largely critical reception for the new cast, coupled with declining viewing figures, were cited as the main reasons for the show's axe. A total of forty episodes were broadcast across four series. The series has never been commercially released on either VHS or DVD, but, digital repeats of the series were broadcast on ITV Encore for the first time in 2014, and all four series were regularly repeated on a rotation basis until the channel was closed in mid-2018. All four series were also released as a box set on Sky Go in 2016.

Cast

Main cast
 Martin Shaw as Dr. (later Prof.) Robert Kingsford, Head of Department/Clinical Consultant (Series 1–4)
 Niamh Cusack as Dr. Christine Fletcher, Senior House Officer/Consultant/Director of Critical Care (Series 1–4)
 David Harewood as Dr. Mike Gregson, Registrar (Series 1–3)
 Esther Hall as Dr. Louise Macken, Senior House Officer (Series 1–3)
 Paul Warriner as Dr. Stuart Phelan, Senior House Officer/Registrar (Series 1–3)
 David Partridge as Dr. David Scobie, Senior House Officer/Trauma Surgeon (Series 1–3)
 Jane Slavin as Cathy Jordan, Ward Sister (Series 1–3)
 Katie McEwen as Judy Enshaw, Charge Nurse (Series 1–4)
 Connor McIntyre as Terry Harker, Charge Nurse (Series 1–4)
 Kim Vithana as Yvonne Silver, Ward Sister/Trauma Nurse (Series 1–3)
 Dominic Mafham as Dr. Andrew Argyle, Paediatrician (Series 2–3)
 Tamzin Malleson as Dr. Kate Brady, Senior House Officer (Series 2–3)
 Jane Danson as Samantha Docherty, Nurse Practitioner (Series 3–4)
 Michael Kitchen as Mr. Jack Turner, Trauma & Orthopaedic Surgeon (Series 3–4)
 Silas Carson as Dr. Raz Amin, Anaesthetist (Series 3)
 Jaye Griffiths as Dr. Ruth Cole, Senior House Officer (Series 4)
 James Murray as Dr. Danny Barton, Senior House Officer (Series 4)
 Michele Austin as Poppy Jonston, Ward Sister (Series 4)
 Don Gallagher as Dr. Jeffrey Drummond, Clinical Director (Series 4)
 Emily Hamilton as Dr. Saskia Walker, Senior House Officer (Series 4)
 Ben Taylor as Dr. James Da Costa, Registrar (Series 4)

Additional cast
 Con O'Neill as Kenny Fletcher, Relative (Series 1)
 Catherine Russell as Issy Howell, Relative (Series 1–2)
 Neal Trotman as Paul Gregson, Relative (Series 1–2)
 Leon Trotman as Richie Gregson, Relative (Series 1–2)
 Alan Williams as Martin McMad, Patient (Series 1–2)
 Andy Quine as Dale, Paramedic (Series 1–4)
 Naomie Thompson as Tricia, Paramedic (Series 1–4)
 Josh Moran as Josh, Paramedic (Series 1–3)
 Lisa Rigby as Jane, Paramedic (Series 2–3)
 Dean Williamson as Alan, Security Officer (Series 1–2)
 Bill Rodgers as Freddie, Security Officer (Series 1–2)
 Cathy Tyson as Stella Gregson, Relative (Series 2)
 John Lloyd Fillingham as Steve Moore, Relative (Series 3)
 Parminder Nagra as Sunita Verma, Hospital Cafè Staff (Series 4)
 Ronny Jhutti as Ajay Verma, Porter (Series 4)
 Bhasker Patel as Raj Verma, Hospital Café Manager (Series 4)
 Judy Holt as Jean Kenning, Receptionist (Series 4)
 Amanda Abbington as Tessa Bailey, Relative (Series 4)

Episodes

Series 1 (1999)

Series 2 (2000)

Series 3 (2001)

Series 4 (2002)

References

External links

1999 British television series debuts
2002 British television series endings
1990s British drama television series
2000s British drama television series
1990s British medical television series
2000s British medical television series
ITV television dramas
Television shows produced by Granada Television
Television series by ITV Studios
English-language television shows
Television shows set in Manchester